is a Japanese photographer.

References

External links 
 Tsuneo Enari's works at Tokyo Digital Museum

1936 births
Living people
People from Sagamihara
Japanese photographers
Recipients of the Medal with Purple Ribbon